Vladimir Nikolayevich Filimonov (born 21 July 1965) is a former Russian professional football player.

Honours
 Russian First League top scorer: 37 goals (Zone Center, 1993).

External links
 

1965 births
Sportspeople from Perm, Russia
Living people
Soviet footballers
Russian footballers
Association football forwards
FC Rotor Volgograd players
FC Alga Bishkek players
FC Zhemchuzhina Sochi players
FC Vostok players
FC Luch Vladivostok players
FC Akhmat Grozny players
Soviet Top League players
Russian Premier League players
Kazakhstan Premier League players
Russian expatriate footballers
Expatriate footballers in Kazakhstan
FC Zvezda Perm players